Innodisk Corporation is a Taiwanese provider of industrial embedded flash and storage products and technologies, with a focus on enterprise, industrial and aerospace industries. Founded in 2005 and headquartered in Xizhi District, New Taipei City, its products are mainly embedded storage devices, dynamic random access memory modules, embedded peripheral modules, software and related technical services.

History
Innodisk was formally established in Taiwan in March 2005. Subsidiaries were established in the following years, with the U.S. subsidiary in October 2008, the subsidiary in Japan in February 2010 and a subsidiary in China in January 2011.  

An office in the Netherlands was established in April 2012, which was restructured into a Dutch subsidiary in January 2015.  

The company went public in August of the same year and was listed in October 2012. In November 2013 the stocks were listed on the OTC.  

In January 2013, the company launched a new corporate identity image. In December 2015, the company established the Innodisk International Education Foundation. In May 2018, a R&D and Manufacturing Center was completed in Yilan, Taiwan.

Awards and recognitions 

November 2018: Selected as Top 35 Taiwanese International Brands
October 2019: Selected as Top 35 International Brands in Taiwan
March 2019: The Dutch branch opens a new office in Eindhoven
November 2020: Selected as Top 35 International Brands in Taiwan

See also
 List of companies of Taiwan

References

Companies listed on the Taipei Exchange
Computer peripheral companies
Electronics companies established in 2005
Electronics companies of Taiwan
Manufacturing companies based in New Taipei
Multinational companies headquartered in Taiwan
Taiwanese brands
Taiwanese companies established in 2005